Loana Lecomte (born 8 August 1999) is a French cross-country and mountain bike cyclist.

Career
In her first season as a junior in 2016, Lecomte became French champion and won several races of the Coupe de France de VTT. In her second season as a junior, she won silver in cross country at the UCI Mountain Bike World Championships and the UEC Mountain Bike European Championships. After moving to the U23, she was once again on the podium at the World and European Championships in 2019.
In 2020, Lecomte raced, and won, her first World Cup race as an elite and then went on to claim world and European championship titles with victory in the UCI Mountain Bike & Trials World Championships – Team relay at the 2020 UCI Mountain Bike World Championships in Leogang and the U-23 race at the European Mountain Bike Championships in Monteceneri.

She followed this up when on 16 May 2021 Lecomte won her second consecutive UCI Mountain Bike World Cup race after victories in Albstadt and Nové Město.

Major results

2016
 1st  Cross-country, National Junior Championships
2017
 1st  Cross-country, National Junior Championships
 2nd  Cross-country, UCI World Junior Championships
 2nd  Cross-country, UEC European Junior Championships
2019
 1st  Cross-country, National Under-23 Championships
 UCI World Championships
3rd  Team relay
3rd  Under-23 Cross-country
 3rd  Cross-country, UEC European Under-23 Championships
2020
 UCI World Championships
1st  Team relay
1st  Under-23 Cross-country
 UEC European Championships
1st  Under-23 Cross-country
2nd  Team relay
 1st  Cross-country, National Under-23 Championships
 2nd Overall UCI XCO World Cup
1st Nové Město I
3rd Nové Město II
 2nd Cross-country, National Championships
 Swiss Bike Cup
3rd Leukerbad
 French Cup
3rd Alpe d'Huez
2021
 1st  Cross-country, National Championships
 1st  Overall UCI XCO World Cup
1st Albstadt
1st Nové Město
1st Leogang
1st Les Gets
 French Cup
1st Lons-le-Saunier
 Internazionali d’Italia Series
1st Nalles
2022
 1st  Cross-country, UEC European Championships
 1st  Cross-country, National Championships
 UCI XCO World Cup
1st Leogang
1st Lenzerheide
2nd Val di Sole
3rd Petropolis
 UCI XCC World Cup
1st Leogang
2nd Val di Sole
 French Cup
1st Le Bessat
1st Le Dévoluy

References

1999 births
Living people
French female cyclists
French mountain bikers
UCI Mountain Bike World Champions (women)
Cross-country mountain bikers
Cyclists at the 2020 Summer Olympics
Olympic cyclists of France
Sportspeople from Annecy
Cyclists from Auvergne-Rhône-Alpes